Lalla is a rural locality in the local government area (LGA) of Launceston in the Launceston LGA region of Tasmania. The 2016 census recorded a population of 87 for the state suburb of Lalla.

History 
Lalla was gazetted as a locality in 1963. The name is believed to be an Aboriginal word for “ant”.

Geography
The boundaries consist of survey lines.

Road infrastructure 
Route C822 (Lalla Road) passes through from west to east.

References

Towns in Tasmania
Localities of City of Launceston